Coolamonis a town in the Riverina region of south-west New South Wales, Australia. The town is situated on the railway line between Junee and Narrandera. It is the administrative and service centre for the local government area which bears its name—Coolamon Shire.

History
The name of Coolamon comes from the Aboriginal word for a basin-shaped wooden dish made and used by Australian Aboriginal people. In the area around the town are thousands of naturally occurring indentations in the ground called Coolamon Holes which fill with water.

The original land where Coolamon now stands, prior to European settlement, was occupied by the Wiradjuri Aboriginal peoples.

A property "Coleman" was first settled there by a Mr J. Atkinson in 1848. The town was surveyed prior to the coming of the railway in 1881.

Cowabbie Post Office opened on 1 May 1881 and was renamed Ganmain on 1 July and Coolamon on 1 November of that year.

At the outbreak of World War 1 Coolamon was hosting the then opposition leader The Right Hon. Andrew Fisher MP. who shortly before addressing a meeting in the Odd Fellow's hall received a telegram from the Prime Minister Joseph Cook advising him that the UK Government had declared war on Germany. He announced to the meeting that Australia would support Britain "to the last man and the last shilling" a line that he would repeat frequently throughout the war, but which was first used in Coolamon. Fisher became Prime Minister following an election held a month later.

Heritage listings 
Coolamon has a number of heritage listed sites, including the Up-To-Date Store which is listed in the NSW State Heritage Register, indicating a place or object that has significance for all of NSW.

Among the locally recognised heritage sites are: 
Shire Offices
Court House and Police Station
historic Post Office
former Fire Station
Railway Station and Station Master's Cottage
Catholic, Anglican and Uniting Church Precincts
RSL Building (now a museum)
Coolamon Hotel

Modern Coolamon

Coolamon is in the wheat belt of New South Wales and is a leading state producer of wheat and chaff. Wheat was first grown in the area in the 1850s. In addition, turkeys and wool are produced and the area is noted for the quality and plumpness of its lambs.

A major industry in the town is Coolamon Steelworks, fabricators of chaser bins.

The town's broad main street, which has been restored, retains much of its old world charm with its wrought-iron verandahs and awnings. Various bric-a-brac, antique shops, tourist coffee lounge, and a modern bread bakery and cafe invite passing tourists to stop and explore the town. The Up-to-Date store, designed by architect William Monks, has what is probably the only cash ball cash railway still in situ.
In 2017 a boutique cheese factory was opened on the main street, as a working tourist attraction, and selling various hard and soft cheeses made on the premises.

Coolamon is home to active Rotary and Lions Clubs and a sub-Branch of RSL NSW. 

Kindra State Forest is located at Coolamon.

Sport
The most popular sport in Coolamon is Australian rules football, as it lies in the narrow 'canola belt', a geographical triangle stretching from the Grong Grong and Marrar at either end of the Canola Way, to Lake Cargelligo, in which Australian football retains a strong following in the rugby league supporting state of New South Wales. The town's team, the Coolamon Rovers Football and Netball Club, which competes as the Coolamon Grasshoppers, competes in the Riverina Football League.

Coolamon is home to an 18-hole sand green golf course, 10 rink synthetic bowling green, four synthetic tennis courts and four touch football fields operated by the Coolamon Sports and Recreation Club.

Railway station

Coolamon railway station opened in 1881 as Cowabbie Road. The station name was quickly changed to Coleman and finally the name Coolamon was settled on in 1895. The coming of the railway allowed greater ease in transporting the area's products to distant markets.

Coolamon is a served by the twice weekly NSW TrainLink Xplorer service operating between Sydney and Griffith. NSW TrainLink also operate a road coach service from Wagga Wagga to Griffith via Coolamon.

References

External links

Riverina Redevelopment Board Website
Coolamon Shire Council
Coolamon Sport and Recreation Club
Coolamon Lions Club

Towns in the Riverina
Towns in New South Wales
1881 establishments in Australia
Coolamon Shire